The PMR-4 is a Yugoslavian anti-personnel stake mine. The mine was apparently not mass-produced, but built in small numbers.

The mine has a small grenade like main body with a number (typically 23) fragmentation grooves running around the circumference and an integral stake. The mine uses either a UPM-1 or UPM-2A fuze

Specifications
 Height: 130 mm (without fuze and stake)
 Diameter: 80 mm
 Weight: 2 kg
 Explosive content: 0.2 kg of TNT (explosive) or commercial explosives
 Operating pressure: 2 to 4 kg pull
 Fuze: UPM-1 or UPM-2A

References
 Jane's Mines and Mine Clearance 2005-2006

Anti-personnel mines